Michael Robert Wagner (born June 22, 1949) is a former professional football player, a safety for 10 seasons with the Pittsburgh Steelers of the National Football League (NFL). He won four Super Bowls as a member of the famed Steel Curtain defense.

Playing career
Born in Waukegan, Illinois, Wagner graduated in 1967 from Carmel High School in Mundelein. He played college football at Western Illinois University in Macomb, earning NAIA All-American status in 1969. He was added to the Western Illinois Athletics Hall of Fame in 1976.

Wagner was selected by the Pittsburgh Steelers in the 11th round of the 1971 NFL Draft, the 268th overall selection. First looked at as a wide receiver on offense, he was soon switched to defense as a safety. Wagner tied for the NFL lead with eight interceptions in 1973, appeared in the 1975 and 1976 Pro Bowls and recorded 36 career interceptions and 12 fumble recoveries. He won four Super Bowls, recording interceptions in Super Bowl IX and Super Bowl X. After ten seasons with the Steelers, he retired in January 1981.

After retirement
Wagner is currently a defensive backs coach at Pine-Richland High School in Gibsonia, Pennsylvania. He was interviewed for the NFL Films documentary series America's Game: The Super Bowl Champions on the 1975 Pittsburgh Steelers.

For a short time, Mike Wagner also served as an assistant coach on the Pine-Richland High School (Gibsonia, PA) coaching staff, mainly working with the defensive backs and special teams.

Mike Wagner was the guest speaker at the 3rd annual Steel City Mafia Banquet in Latrobe, Pennsylvania, on August 15, 2009.

After pro football, Wagner applied his bachelor's degree in accounting and worked in the financial industry. He earned an M.B.A. from the University of Pittsburgh and, as of 2012, is a bank vice president in Pittsburgh.

References

External links
 

1949 births
Living people
American football safeties
Pittsburgh Steelers players
Western Illinois Leathernecks football players
American Conference Pro Bowl players
People from Mundelein, Illinois
Sportspeople from Waukegan, Illinois
Players of American football from Illinois